Palaeonictinae ("ancient weasels") is an extinct subfamily of placental mammals from extinct family Oxyaenidae, that lived from the late Paleocene to early Eocene of Europe and North America.

Classification and phylogeny

Taxonomy 
 Subfamily: †Palaeonictinae (Denison, 1938)
 Genus: †Ambloctonus (Cope, 1875)
 †Ambloctonus major (Denison, 1938)
 †Ambloctonus priscus (Matthew & Granger, 1915)
 †Ambloctonus sinosus (Cope, 1875)
 Genus: †Dipsalodon (paraphyletic genus) (Jepsen, 1930)
 †Dipsalodon churchillorum (Rose, 1981)
 †Dipsalodon matthewi (Jepsen, 1930)
 Genus: †Palaeonictis (de Blainville, 1842)
 †Palaeonictis gigantea (de Blainville, 1842)
 †Palaeonictis occidentalis (Osborn, 1892)
 †Palaeonictis peloria (Rose, 1981)
 †Palaeonictis wingi (Chester, 2010)

Phylogeny 
The phylogenetic relationships of the subfamily Palaeonictinae are shown in the following cladogram:

See also 
 Mammal classification
 Oxyaenidae

References 

 
Mammal subfamilies